Gaylord Ridge is a solitary north–south ridge,  long, located  northwest of Eilers Peak in the western part of the Nebraska Peaks. It was named by the Advisory Committee on Antarctic Names after D.R. Gaylord of the University of Nebraska, a member of the United States Antarctic Research Program glaciological team during the Ross Ice Shelf Project, 1973–74 field season.

See also
Kirchner Peak

References

Ridges of Oates Land